Shushan District is one of four urban districts of the prefecture-level city of Hefei, the capital of Anhui Province, East China. It contains 8 subdistricts and two towns.

Administrative divisions
Shushan District is divided to 8 subdistricts and 2 towns.
Subdistricts

Towns
Jinggang
Nangang

References

Hefei